is a Japanese football player of Gainare Tottori.

Club career statistics
Updated to 22 February 2018.

References

External links
Profile at Gainare Tottori

1991 births
Living people
Hannan University alumni
Association football people from Kanagawa Prefecture
Japanese footballers
J1 League players
J2 League players
J3 League players
Japan Football League players
Kawasaki Frontale players
Shonan Bellmare players
Zweigen Kanazawa players
FC Imabari players
Gainare Tottori players
Association football midfielders